Edmund William Alfred "Eddie" Smith (23 March 1929 – April 1993) was an English footballer who played as a forward in the Football League for Watford, Northampton Town, Colchester United and Queens Park Rangers. He was also on the books at Chelsea and Bournemouth but failed to make an appearance for either team.

Career

Born in Marylebone, London, Smith joined Chelsea from non-league Wealdstone in May 1950. He spent two seasons at Stamford Bridge but couldn't break into the first-team. He then moved to Bournemouth where he spent a further season with no first-team appearances. In the 1953–54 season, Smith accumulated 12 goals in 38 games for Watford, where he moved following his frustrating season with Bournemouth.

After a dispute with one of the Watford directors, Smith signed for Northampton Town for a fee of £5,000 but again fell out with his employers after notching 12 goals in 53 league appearances. Colchester United manager Benny Fenton signed Smith in June 1956 and scored 13 times in 35 appearances in a season where Colchester ran rivals Ipswich Town close for the Third Division South title.

Smith's Colchester debut came in the Essex derby on the opening day of the 1956–57 season where the U's won 3–2 at Layer Road. He opened his account four days later at Crystal Palace with a hat-trick, and scored a further treble against Reading on 19 January 1957. While playing for Colchester, Smith lived in London and requested a transfer in June 1957 to reduce the amount of travelling required. The U's sold Smith to Queens Park Rangers for more than they initially paid for him, ending his spell with the club with a record of 13 goals in 35 league matches.

QPR did not get a great return on their investment in Smith as he could score only one goal in 17 games during a stint blighted by injury, including a several-month stay on the sidelines with a knee injury. After a single season with the R's, Smith again moved on, this time to Chelmsford City and then Wisbech Town.

After Smith retired from the game, he started his own electrical business in the Willesden area. He died in April 1993.

References

1929 births
1993 deaths
Footballers from Marylebone
English footballers
Association football forwards
Wealdstone F.C. players
Chelsea F.C. players
AFC Bournemouth players
Watford F.C. players
Northampton Town F.C. players
Colchester United F.C. players
Queens Park Rangers F.C. players
Chelmsford City F.C. players
Wisbech Town F.C. players
English Football League players